Hamline Chapel, United Methodist Church is a historic Methodist church located at High and Vine Streets in Lawrenceburg, Dearborn County, Indiana. It was built about 1847, and is a one-story, gable front, Greek Revival style brick building on a raised basement.  A rear addition was built about 1900 and two-story Sunday School and office addition in the 1950s.  The church was renovated in 1979.

It was added to the National Register of Historic Places in 1982. It is located in the Downtown Lawrenceburg Historic District.

References

External links

Methodist churches in Indiana
Churches on the National Register of Historic Places in Indiana
Greek Revival church buildings in Indiana
Churches completed in 1847
Churches in Dearborn County, Indiana
National Register of Historic Places in Dearborn County, Indiana
1847 establishments in Indiana
Historic district contributing properties in Indiana